The Cruz Water Catchment, also known historically as Finona's Water Catchment, is a historic private water supply structure in the United States territory of Guam. It is located south of Guam Highway 9 in the village of Potts Junction in the central northern part of the island. It was built, according to local oral history, about 1920, and was used to capture rainfall from a nearby house that was destroyed by Typhoon Karen in 1962. The catchment was used to provide water to as many as seven local households, making possible year-round living in an area otherwise lacking fresh water.

The structure was listed on the National Register of Historic Places in 1994.

See also
National Register of Historic Places listings in Guam

References

Buildings and structures on the National Register of Historic Places in Guam
Buildings and structures completed in 1920
Buildings and structures in Guam
1920 establishments in Guam
Yigo, Guam
Water supply infrastructure on the National Register of Historic Places
Water in Guam